Opalikha is a railway station of Line D2 of the Moscow Central Diameters in Krasnogorsk, Moscow Oblast. It was opened in 1901 and rebuilt in 2020.

Gallery

References

Railway stations in Moscow Oblast
Railway stations of Moscow Railway
Railway stations in the Russian Empire opened in 1901
Line D2 (Moscow Central Diameters) stations